Kaeser and Käser are the German and Swiss forms, respectively, of the same German-language surname, referring to a maker or seller of cheese (compare English Cheeseman). Notable people with the surname include:
 Adrian Käser, Swiss sidecarcross World Champion
 Angelika Dreock-Käser, German Para-cyclist
 Carl Kaeser, German founder of Kaeser Compressors
 Elisabeth Käser (born 1951), Swiss slalom canoeist 
 H. J. Kaeser (1904 – 1965), German Jewish author
 Helmut Käser (1912 – 1994), Swiss general secretary of FIFA
 Joe Kaeser (born 1957), German CEO of Siemens
 Viviane Käser (born 1985), Swiss figure skater

German-language surnames
Occupational surnames